Tomás Martín Molina (born 12 April 1995) is an Argentine professional footballer who plays as a forward for Liga MX club Juárez.

Career
Molina started his career with Huracán. His professional debut came on 27 February 2016 in a 1–1 draw with San Lorenzo. Three more appearances followed in 2016 and 2016–17, prior to Molina leaving on loan in January 2018 to join Primera B Metropolitana side Almirante Brown. He featured for Almirante Brown for the first time on 27 January versus Comunicaciones.

Career statistics
.

References

External links

1995 births
Living people
Argentine footballers
Argentine expatriate footballers
Sportspeople from Buenos Aires Province
Association football forwards
Argentine Primera División players
Primera B Metropolitana players
Primera Nacional players
Ecuadorian Serie A players
Club Atlético Huracán footballers
Club Almirante Brown footballers
Club Atlético Brown footballers
Ferro Carril Oeste footballers
L.D.U. Quito footballers
Argentine expatriate sportspeople in Ecuador